The 28th Expeditionary Combat Aviation Brigade is a heavy aviation unit of the Pennsylvania Army National Guard. The Combat Aviation Brigade (CAB) is one of four brigades of the 28th Infantry Division. It provides aviation assets for both federal and state active duty missions. The aviators of the CAB fly the Sikorsky UH-60 Black Hawk, Eurocopter UH-72A Lakota and Boeing CH-47 Chinook helicopters. The CAB headquarters is at Muir Army Airfield, Fort Indiantown Gap, located north of Harrisburg, Pennsylvania.

The brigade commander is Lt. Col. Michael Girvin, and the Command Sergeant Major is Command Sgt. Maj. Sean Livolsi.

Currently, the brigade is made up of the:
 Headquarters and Headquarters Company (HHC) 
 2d Battalion (General Support), 104th Aviation Regiment (2-104th GSAB)
 628th Aviation Support Battalion (628th ASB)

History
The Aviation Brigade traces its heritage to 1 June 1959 with the activation of the 28th Aviation Company at the Capital City Airport, New Cumberland, Pennsylvania. The unit was reorganized as the 28th Aviation Battalion on 1 April 1963 and later relocated to 18th and Herr Streets (1976) and 21st and Herr Streets (1980) in Harrisburg, Pennsylvania.

On 1 October 1986, the Aviation Brigade was organized under the Army of Excellence (AOE) design. Station relocation to the World War II barracks in area 2, Fort Indiantown Gap, occurred on 1 May 1992 for HHC, Aviation Brigade, and Detachment 1, HHT, Troops C and D (Air), 1st Squadron, 104th Cavalry, ending 33 years of service in the Harrisburg area.

As of mid-1999, the brigade operated 86 Bell UH-1 Iroquois "Huey" and Bell AH-1 Cobra helicopters, as well as a supporting element of 27 M1 Abrams tanks and other ground combat equipment. Although training in the brigade is focused on possible employment in time of war, its soldiers are frequently called on to rescue endangered citizens and perform other emergency missions across the state.

2009 Iraq deployment 
Soldiers of the CAB, 28th Infantry Division began mobilization on 29 January 2009 for Operation Iraqi Freedom 09-11. Over 2,000 soldiers from multiple states completed validation training at Fort Sill, Oklahoma before moving to Camp Buehring, Kuwait. Throughout the opening days of May 2009, soldiers flew into multiple forward operating bases across Iraq with the majority of the brigade based out of Tallil, Al Kut, and Basrah.

Headquarters, Combat Aviation Brigade
 2d Battalion (General Support), 104th Aviation Regiment
 Company A (Assault), 1st Battalion, 106th Aviation Regiment
 Company B (Heavy Lift), 2d Battalion, 104th Aviation Regiment
 Company C (Attack), 3d Battalion, 159th Aviation Regiment***
 Company C (Medical Evacuation), 1st Battalion, 52nd Aviation Regiment
 Company D (Maintenance), 2d Battalion, 104th Aviation Regiment
 Company E (Supply), 2d Battalion, 104th Aviation Regiment
 1st Battalion, 189th Aviation Regiment (Montana Army National Guard)
 1st Battalion (Assault Helicopter), 150th Aviation Regiment
 1st Battalion, 224th Aviation Regiment
 628th Aviation Support Battalion (628th ASB)

(*** Company C, 3d Battalion, 159th Aviation Regiment is a Regular Army unit that was OPCON to the 2d Battalion (General Support), 104th Aviation Regiment during OIF 08-10. It is currently task organized as a part of the 12th Combat Aviation Brigade stationed in Germany.)

2020 Middle East deployment 

The brigade deployed to the Middle East in the summer of 2020 replacing the Combat Aviation Brigade, 34th Infantry Division. The 28th ECAB, operating under the name Task Force Anvil, is made up of almost 2000 Soldiers from the active component and nine different states' national guards- Indiana, New Jersey, Ohio, West Virginia, Wisconsin, Michigan, Nebraska and Oklahoma with the majority of Soldiers coming from Pennsylvania. They are conducting combat operations and providing military support to civilian authorities in support or Operation Spartan Shield, maintaining a U.S. military posture in southwest Asia, and Operation Inherent Resolve, the fight against Daesh. Everyone from the 28th ECAB returned home safely by June 2021. 

The 28th ECAB's primary elements included:
 Headquarters and Headquarters Company
 628th Aviation Support Battalion
 2d Battalion (General Support), 104th Aviation Regiment
 1st Battalion (Assault), 137th Aviation Regiment
4th Battalion (Attack Reconnaissance), 4th Combat Aviation Brigade

References

 Global Security.Org, About the 28th Combat Aviation Brigade

Aviation Brigades of the United States Army
CAB028
Pennsylvania Army National Guard
Military units and formations in Pennsylvania
Military units and formations established in 1986